The Litany of the Sacred Heart of Jesus is a formal prayer in the Catholic Church dedicated to Sacred Heart of Jesus. It is one of six approved litanies for public use. In 1899, Pope Leo XIII approved the Litany of the Sacred Heart of Jesus for public usage

The Litany 
The Litany of the Most Sacred Heart of Jesus is said as:

Lord, have mercy.
Christ, have mercy.
Lord, have mercy.
Christ, hear us.
Christ, graciously hear us.

God, the Father of Heaven, have mercy on us.
God, the Son, Redeemer of the World, have mercy on us.
God, the Holy Ghost, have mercy on us.
Holy Trinity, one God, have mercy on us.

Heart of Jesus, Son of the Eternal Father, have mercy on us.
Heart of Jesus, formed in the womb of the Virgin Mother by the Holy Ghost, have mercy on us.
Heart of Jesus, united substantially with the word of God, have mercy on us.
Heart of Jesus, of infinite majesty, have mercy on us.
Heart of Jesus, holy temple of God, have mercy on us.
Heart of Jesus, tabernacle of the Most High, have mercy on us.
Heart of Jesus, house of God and gate of heaven, have mercy on us.
Heart of Jesus, glowing furnace of charity, have mercy on us.
Heart of Jesus, vessel of justice and love, have mercy on us.
Heart of Jesus, full of goodness and love, have mercy on us.
Heart of Jesus, abyss of all virtues, have mercy on us.
Heart of Jesus, most worthy of all praise, have mercy on us.
Heart of Jesus, king and center of all hearts, have mercy on us.
Heart of Jesus, in whom are all the treasures of wisdom and knowledge, have mercy on us.
Heart of Jesus, in whom dwelleth all the fullness of the Divinity, have mercy on us.
Heart of Jesus, in whom the Father is well pleased, have mercy on us.
Heart of Jesus, of whose fullness we have all received, have mercy on us.
Heart of Jesus, desire of the everlasting hills, have mercy on us.
Heart of Jesus, patient and rich in mercy, have mercy on us.
Heart of Jesus, rich to all who invoke Thee, have mercy on us.
Heart of Jesus, fount of life and holiness, have mercy on us.
Heart of Jesus, propitiation for our sins, have mercy on us.
Heart of Jesus, saturated with revilings, have mercy on us.
Heart of Jesus, crushed for our iniquities, have mercy on us.
Heart of Jesus, made obedient unto death, have mercy on us.
Heart of Jesus, pierced with a lance, have mercy on us.
Heart of Jesus, source of all consolation, have mercy on us.
Heart of Jesus, our life and resurrection, have mercy on us.
Heart of Jesus, our peace and reconciliation, have mercy on us.
Heart of Jesus, victim for our sins, have mercy on us.
Heart of Jesus, salvation of those who hope in Thee, have mercy on us.
Heart of Jesus, hope of those who die in Thee, have mercy on us.
Heart of Jesus, delight of all saints, have mercy on us.

Lamb of God, who takest away the sins of the world, spare us, O Lord.
Lamb of God, who takest away the sins of the world, graciously hear us, O Lord,
Lamb of God who takest away the sins of the world, have mercy on us.

V. Jesus, meek and humble of Heart.
R. Make our hearts like unto Thine.

Let us pray
Almighty and everlasting God, look upon the Heart of Thy well-beloved Son and upon the acts of praise and satisfaction which He renders unto Thee in the name of sinners; and do Thou, in Thy great goodness, grant pardon to them who seek Thy mercy, in the name of the same Thy Son, Jesus Christ, who liveth and reigneth with Thee, world without end. 
Amen.

See also 
 Prayer in the Catholic Church
 Litanies

References 

Litanies